The Bijapur Fort (Vijapur kote) is located in the Bijapur city in Bijapur District of the Indian state of Karnataka. Bijapur fort has a plethora of historical monuments of architectural importance built during the rule of Adil Shahi dynasty.

The Adil Shahi Sultans who ruled for nearly 200 years in Bijapur had expended their utmost authority, almost exclusively, on architecture and the allied arts, each Sultan endeavored to excel his predecessor in the number, size, or splendor of his building projects. As a result, the buildings seen in and around Bijapur Fort and the town have been rightly called as the Agra of South India.

History

The rich history of the fort, the citadel, and other structures is subsumed in the history of Bijapur city, which was established in the 10th–11th centuries by the Kalyani Chalukyas. It was then known as Vijayapura (city of victory). The city came under the influence of the Khalji Sultanate in Delhi by the late 13th century. In 1347, the area was conquered by the Bahmani Sultanate of Gulbarga. By this time, the city was being referred as Vijapur or Bijapur.

Yusuf Adil Shah, son of Murad II, the Sultan of Turkey had joined the Bidar court of the sultanate in 1481 under the then Sultan Mohammed III. He had been purchased as slave by Mahmud Gavan, the prime minister of the kingdom. He was later, in 1481, appointed as the Governor of Bijapur for his loyalty and bravery shown in the active defense of the sultanate. The fort and the citadel or Arkilla and the Faroukh Mahal were built by him with the skilled architects and artisans whom he had inducted into his employment from Persia, Turkey and Rome. Yusuf declared himself independent of Sultan’s rule and thus established the Adil Shahi dynasty or the Bahmani kingdom, in 1489 (in 1482, the Bahmini empire broke into five kingdoms and Bijapur sultanate was one of them).

Ibrahim Adil Shah, son of Yusuf Adil Shah by his Hindu wife Punji (daughter of a Maratha warrior), succeeded his father who died in 1510. Since he was a minor at the time of his father's death, there was an attempt to grab the throne, which was effectively thwarted by the timely intervention of his valiant mother fighting for her son's cause in male attire. He then became the ruler of Bijapur Sultanate. He was instrumental in making further additions to the fort and also building the Jami Masjid within the fort.

Ali built several structures in the fort and the city suburbs, such as the Gagan Mahal, Ali Rauza (his own tomb), Chand Bawdi (a large well) and the Jami Masjid.

Since Ali did not have a son of his own, his nephew Ibrahim II was crowned the king. But he was also a minor when he was crowned and his mother Chand Bibi effectively protected him, acting as the regent of Bijapur. Ibrahim, the fifth king of the dynasty of Bahmanis, was a tolerant and an intellectual king who forged good relationship between Hindus and Muslims and also between Shia and Sunni Muslims in his kingdom and ushered harmony among the people of his kingdom; history has therefore titled him with the name of "Jagadguru Badshah". He ruled for 46 years. He also built Hindu temples within his palace precincts and composed verses dedicated to Saraswati (Hindu goddess of learning) and Ganapati, the Hindu god of wisdom. He was also a great patron of music and learning. He built the world-famous Gol Gumbaz (the second biggest dome in the world with whispering galleries). During his reign, the historic Mallik-E-Maidan, the gun position, was erected in the fort precincts. The gun is a massive arsenal of  length, which is seen even now at the same location in a good condition.

In the last decade of Adil Shah’s power, when he fell sick, his wife Bariba is said to have ruled. After he died in 1646, his adopted son Ali Adil Shah II came to power but there were internal struggles for the reins of power. The dynasty's control thus weakened. Bijapur was greatly weakened after the defeat of Afzal Khan and his 10,000 man Bijapur forces by the Maratha ruler Shivaji Maharaj, who had attacked Bijapur repeatedly and plundered it but later agreed to an armistice to consolidate his forces to capture Karnataka. But after Shivaji Maharaj died, the Mughal led by Aurangzeb finally annexed the kingdom after the Siege of Bijapur in the year 1686 that eventually ended with the death of Sikandar Adil Shah the last of the Adil Shahi's. With this defeat, the 200-year rule of Adil Shahi dynasty ended and Bijapur sultanate was incorporated into the Mughal Empire, in 1686. During this period, Adil Shah had started building his mausoleum, called the Bara Kaman, but he died before he could complete it.

Two centuries later, in 1877, during the British rule, due to scarcity (famine conditions) Bijapur city was found in a desolate and deserted state that was compared to similarly placed ruined cities of Baalbek in Bekaa Valley of Lebanon or Pompeiopolis in Rome. The palaces and tombs in the fort were in ruins. Bijapur was like the city of the dead, for there was no water or food in the city.

Structures
The fort precinct is studded with the historical fort, palaces, mosques, tombs and gardens built by the Adil Shahis with their deep interest in architecture (in Persian, Ottoman Turkish and the allied arts. Some ruins of ancient temples, predating the Adilshahi period, are also seen. The most striking structures, in the order of their importance, are the Citadel or Arkilla, the Jamia Masjid (or Jumma masjid), the Gagan Mahal palace, the tomb of Ali Rauza or Ibrahim Roza (tomb of Ibrahim Adil Shah I), Chand Bawdi or Taj Bavdi (a large well), Mahatar Mahal (Dilkusha Mahal), Malikah-e-Jahan Mosque, Jal Mahal, and also an innocuous well in the vicinity of the fort with a legend of a tragedy linked to a brave but jealous general of the dynasty. It is said that the Adilshahis, during their reign of 200 years, built over 50 mosques, 20 tombs and 20 palaces. Bijapur has, therefore, been called as Agra of South India.

Apart from these monuments, Ibrahim II also built the Dattatreya Temple, to the west of the citadel. It contains a pair of paduka (foot sandals) of saint Narasimha Saraswati.

Fort
The fort and the citadel within it were completed by Yusuf Adil Shah in 1566. They were built in two concentric circles. The east–west axis of the fort measures . The circumferential length of the fort’s outer wall, which encloses the old city, measures . It is strongly fortified with the most massive materials with ninety-six large bastions of various designs. The bastions are decorated with "crenellations and interspersed with machicolations". In addition, there are ten other bastions at the five main gateways (which are arched and decorated entrances) to the fort.

The five gateways in the fort are the Makka gate on the west, the Shahapur gate at the north-west corner, the Bahmani gate on the north, the Allahpur gate on the east, and the Fateh gate on the south-east.

In the days when Bijapur Sultanate commanded almost the whole of the Deccan territory, the strongly fortified fort had more than 1000 canons made of brass and iron. The palace inside was encompassed by two moats. As also reported, in the mid 16th century, the palace was guarded by 2000 men and the city had a garrison of 5000 men headed by Nammouth Chan, an Italian.

Jamia masjid

Jamia Masjid located in the southeast part of the city, the largest mosque of Bijapur, was started in 1565, but not fully completed. It has an arcaded prayer hall with fine aisles supported on massive piers and has an impressive dome in the façade which has nine bays. The large courtyard also has a water tank. It is called the Jami Masjid or Jumma Masjid as Qutba is read here every Friday. The mosque building is in a rectangular shape of size  x . The façade depicts nine large arches with five inner arches enclosing 45 compartments; the building is incomplete as two minarets are missing or not built. The dome is semicircular in shape. In 1636, the arched shaped mehrab in the mosque was gilded and inscribed with Persian verses, at the instance of Muhammad Adil Shah. Another interesting feature is the 2250 inlaid rectangular tiles in the form of prayer rugs seen in the prayer hall. The tiles were laid at the orders of the Mughal emperor Aurangzeb. Aurangzeb also got the mosque extended with an eastern gate and verandahs to the east, the south and the north.

Ibrahim Rauza

Ibrahim Rauza (‘Rauza’ means "tomb") also known as Ali Rauza, built in 1627, contains the tomb of Ibrahim Adil Shah II and his queen Taj Sultana. It was originally intended to be the tomb for the queen. It is a fine square structure with twin buildings with delicate carvings. It was designed by the Persian architect, Malik Sandal (his grave also lies in the courtyard). The tomb (of Ibrahim Adil Shah II, his two sons, and his mother) on the left and a mosque on the right within it are set in a walled garden (about  square) facing each other over an ornamental pond. The tomb as such is in a central chamber of  square and has a ceiling that is divided into nine squares with curved sides. Graceful minarets mark the corners of each symmetrical building, surmounted by a dome rising from a lotus petal base. Steps are provided to approach the raised platform on which the two structures have been built. It is said that this tomb provided the inspiration for building the Taj Mahal at Agra. The structure has been erected on a single rock slab and has a basement, which was used to store ammunition and food. In the prayer hall in the mosque, there are two chains carved out of a single rock. It has impressive gateways. The doors are made of teak wood braced with metal strips and decorated. The inner perimeter of the Mausoleum has well-crafted arches. The outer walls of the tomb have panels displaying geometric and calligraphic designs in the form of perforated screens and shallow relief. The windows and doors also have similar motifs, which allow light to penetrate into the tomb chamber. A special acoustic feature of the mosque mentioned is that standing next to the grave of the Sultan inside the tomb at one end, prayers can be distinctly heard at the other end. Impressed by its architectural splendour, Henry Cousens, an expert in Art and Architecture called it the "Taj Mahal of the South". The left of the building resembles the Taj Mahal in Agra, The middle gateway resembles the Charminar in Hyderabad and the right of the building resembles the Bibi Ka Maqbara in Aurangabad.

Mehtar Mahal

Though modestly sized, Mehtar Mahal dated to 1620 is one of the most elegant structures in the fort; the entry gate in particular has been built in Indo-Saracenic style. The façade has three arches, which depict exquisite "cornice supported on carved corbels". A gateway leads to the Mehtar mosque, which is a three-storey building. It has two slender minarets that are covered with delicately carved birds and rows of swans. The carvings are in Hindu architectural style, in the form of brackets supporting the balconies and stone trellis work. The building has a flat roof and minarets have rounded top.

Barakaman

Barakaman (meaning 12 arches) is a mausoleum of Ali Roza built in 1672. It is located to the north of the citadel and the Gagan Mahal, in the midst of a public garden. It was initially called as Ali Roza, but Shah Nawab Khan changed its name to Bara Kaman, as this was the 12th monument built during his reign and was planned with 12 arches. It is a  square building built on a raised platform. It has now seven arches built of brown basaltic stone, in Gothic style. The tomb is in an inner raised enclosure, which contains the graves of Ali, queens and eleven other ladies, possibly belonging to the Zenana of the queens.

Malik-e-Maidan

The Malik-i-Maidan (Master of the Battlefield), also called Burj-E-Sherz, was erected by Ibrahim Adil Shah II. It was named after the Battle of Talikota of 1565 in which the Vijayanagara Empire was routed. It is now located in the fort on its western ramparts between two bastions. The cannon weighs 55 tonnes and is considered one of the largest medieval guns made. The unusual feature of the gun is that its muzzle is shaped in the form of a lion head with carved open jaws as if devouring an elephant (depicted between the jaws). The gun is cool when touched even during the hot summer season and when tapped gives soft resonating sound. It is said that touching it brings good luck. From the inscriptions on the gun position, it is deduced that the gun was cast in 1549 at Ahmadnagar from bell metal by Muhammad Bin Husain Rumi. Another inscription records that Aurangzeb conquered Bijapur in 1685-86. It is also said that the large weight of the canon discouraged the British from carrying it as a trophy to England.

Gagan Mahal

Gagan Mahal or Heavenly Palace was built by Ali Adil Shah I in 1561 as a royal palace with a durbar hall. It has three impressive arches and the central arch is the widest. The durbar hall was located in the ground floor while the first floor was built as the private residence of the royal family. But both floors are now in ruins.

Sat Manzili
Sat Manzili was originally a seven-storeyed palace but now only five floors exist. It is conjectured that it was a pleasure pavilion built in 1583 during the reign of Ibrahim II Adil Shah.
Such is man's pride, and such is its fall.' In a note, she records a traditional reason for the construction of such an elevated structure.

Asar Mahal

Asar Mahal or palace was constructed in 1646 by the Adil Shahis. It is located to the east of the citadel. A bridge connects it and it is well preserved. It is also known as Dad Mahal since it was initially used as hall of justice. It was later converted as reliquary and has become a highly revered place since it is said to hold two hairs from the beard of Prophet Mohammed. The portico has impressive wooden columns (four numbers of octagonal shape) and is double the normal height and has wooden panelled ceiling. It faces an artificial lake. The walls and ceiling of the hall display landscape paintings. Women are prohibited from entering this Mahal. A picture of Assar Mahal, Beejapore by Thomas Boys was published in Fisher's Drawing Room Scrap Book, 1833 along with a poetical illustration by Letitia Elizabeth Landon (wrongly described as Ruins near Agra).

Taj Bawdi
Taj Bawdi is a water reservoir that was built to commemorate Taj Sultana, Ibrahim II ’s first wife. The entrance arch is very impressive and has two octagonal towers; the east & west wings of the two towers were used as rest houses.

Other attractions
Apart from the monuments within the fort, there are several monuments in Bijapur city of which the most famous is the Gol Gumbaz. The other structures of interest in close vicinity of the fort are the Sangeet – Nari Mahal and Saatkabar (which is linked to the story of a well and 60 graves).

Gol Gumbaz

Gol Gumbaz was built in 1626 by Mohammad Adil Shah. It is built on a raised platform surrounded by a large garden. Its three other rivals, in size, are in Italy -  two of them at Pantheon and St. Peters. The eastern entrance has been converted into a site museum. It is the Mausoleum of Mohammad Adil-Shah (1626–56). It has four seven-storeyed corner towers, each opening on to a unique "whispering gallery".

Sangeet – Nari Mahal

It is one of the important structures typically representing the Adilshahi architecture in the area. It was built in the 16th century. It now has ruins of a palace building and a reservoir, enclosed by a high wall.

Saath Khabar
Saath Kabar (meaning: sixty graves) is called the 'dark tourist spot' in Bijapur as it is a moot witness to a very tragic story linked to it. Local stories and rumors allege that Afzal Khan, the cruel army chief of Ali Adil Shahi-II, killed his 63 wives out of cruel jealousy that they would remarry after his death. Before setting out for a crucial battle with Shivaji, the Maratha warrior, at Pratapgad in Maharashtra in 1659, Afzal Khan murdered his 63 wives at a well near Saath Kabar. The trigger which caused this tragic decision was the prophecy that his astrologers had given that he would lose the war against Shivaji and would also surely die. He, therefore, took his wives to a well at the outer limits of the fort city and pushed them into the well one by one and killed them. When two of his wives tried to escape, they were chased by his soldiers and killed. All 63 wives, who were killed thus, were buried in a place near the well, which has come to be known as "Saath Kabar" (60 graves). The place is now a visitor attraction even though the historic rumor still has not be confirmed or verified.

Visitor information

It is well connected by road rail and air links.

Road links with other towns in North Karnataka are;  Aihole – , Saint Basaveshwara Pilgrim centre–, Basavana Bagevadi – , Almatti - , Badami – , Gulbarga – , and Bidar – .

Air –  The nearest airport is at Belgaum.

Bijapur is a Broad gauge station of the South Western Railways with direct train connections to Bangalore, Mumbai, Hubli, Solapur and Shirdi.

References

External links

 Bijapur Fort on Google Maps

Forts in Karnataka
Bijapur, Karnataka
Artillery of India
Buildings and structures in Bijapur district
Tourist attractions in Bijapur district